Parthenay is an ancient fortified town and commune in the Deux-Sèvres department of the Nouvelle-Aquitaine region in western France. It is sited on a rocky spur that is surrounded on two sides by the River Thouet, and is the sub-prefecture of the Parthenay arrondissement.

Each July, Parthenay hosts the Festival Ludique International de Parthenay, otherwise known as the Festival de Jeux or FLIP, in which the town's streets and squares are filled with games of many types. The shorter indoor FLIP d'hiver runs in November.

History
Legend has it that Parthenay was created with a wave of the fairy Melusine's wand. However the  name of Parthenay first appears in written records at the beginning of the 11th century and there is no evidence of previous significant human occupation in the Middle Ages.

The castle, situated on an easily defended site at the tip of the rocky promontory surrounded by the loop of the river, was built in the 13th century. At the same time the outer fortifications protecting the citadel, and the town itself, were completed.

Economically, Parthenay benefited by being on one of the branches of the Way of St. James, the mediaeval pilgrimage route to Santiago de Compostella in Spain. The main fortified gate, by which pilgrims would enter the town, still bears the name of Saint Jacques (the French name for Saint James).

Historically, Parthenay was considered the capital of the Gâtine Vendéenne, the hilly and wooded area that occupies the centre of the current department of Deux-Sèvres and is quite different in character from the plains to the south, around Niort. Because of the nature of the land, the area became known for the breeding of cattle, and the Parthenais breed is named after the town.

It was not until the 19th century that the town expanded beyond its walls. Wide boulevards and squares were constructed following the line of the old town wall and moat to the east of the town. Beyond these, the railway station was built in 1880, and new districts and industries grew up around this.

Geography
The mediaeval walled town of Parthenay is constructed in a bend of the River Thouet, which surrounds the town on the west and north sides. The highest ground within the walls lies to the south, where the current town centre lies. To the north and west, a spur of high ground runs above cliffs which descend vertically to the riverside park of La Pree. At the northern end of this spur, with the river on two sides, are the remains of the towns fortified chateau. Between the chateau and the town centre along the top of the spur is the citadel, protected by the city wall along the top of the cliffs to the west, and by its own inner walls to the south and east.

To the east of the citadel and the north of the town centre, the land slopes more gently down a small valley to the river. Running down the middle of this valley can be found the Rue de la Vau Saint-Jaques, a narrow mediaeval street that climbs up from the bridge and gateway of the Porte Saint-Jacques to the centre of town. In time of the pilgrimage, this would have been the main pilgrimage route south through the town, and was occupied by weavers.

Outside the city walls, the district of Saint-Jacques occupies land at the northern side of the Saint-Jacques bridge, and was also an area of weavers in mediaeval times. To the west of the town centre, the district of Saint-Paul spills down the steep hill to the river, across the Saint-Paul bridge and around the former Saint-Paul's Priory, founded in the 11th century. The Saint-Paul's district was the home of the town's tanners.

Later expansions to the east and south of the walled town date from the nineteenth century and later, and were encouraged by the construction of the railway and, more recently, the town's eastern by-pass road.

Population

Government
In 2001, the commune of Parthenay joined together with six neighbouring communes to establish the Communauté de communes de Parthenay, which provides a framework within which local tasks are carried out together. This intercommunality was merged into the Communauté de communes de Parthenay-Gâtine in 2014.

Transport
Parthenay is located on the Route nationale 149 (RN149), which runs roughly east–west from Nantes to Poitiers, and which forms part of the European route E62 from Nantes to Genoa. Other major roads link Parthenay to Niort, Saumur, Saint-Maixent-l'École and La Roche-sur-Yon.

Parthenay railway station was formerly a junction on the SNCF rail system, with lines to Niort, Thouars, Poitiers and Bressuire. However, only the lines to Niort and Thouars survive, and these lines now only carry freight trains. The région of Nouvelle-Aquitaine provides inter-urban bus service that connects Parthenay to Niort, Bressuire, Thouars, Poitiers and other local towns and villages.

The nearest airports are at Poitiers (Poitiers - Biard Airport) and Nantes (Nantes Atlantique Airport).

Main sights
The medieval centre of Parthenay contains a number of sights, including:

 The Town Walls, which are particularly visible to the west and north, where they sit on top of and incorporate a high granite outcrop. The outer town walls to the east and south have largely been removed, although their course can still be inferred from the wide boulevards that replaced them, but the eastern wall of the inner citadel can still be seen, rising above the Rue de la Vau Saint-Jaques.
 The Porte St-Jacques and Pont St-Jacques form the entry into the walled town from the north. The bridge crosses the River Thouet before passing through the heavily fortified gateway, which was built in the early 13th century. This would have been the entry into the town used by the pilgrims. Today's visitors can reach the top of the gatehouse, which provides views over the river and lower part of the town.
 The Rue de la Vau Saint-Jaques is a narrow street lined with medieval timber-framed houses, with vegetable plots climbing the slopes that rise above either side of the street. At one time this would have been the main pilgrimage route from the Porte St-Jacques up to the town centre, and was occupied by weavers. Many of the houses retain the wooden ground floor shutters that folded down to form a stall.
 The Porte de l'Horloge is the fortified gateway into the citadel from the town centre, and dates from the 13th century. In 1454, a bell was added to toll the hours, and subsequently clock faces were added to the tower.
 The Église Sainte-Croix is a romanesque church within the citadel, adjacent to the mairie and law courts. It was founded in the 11th century.
 The Église Saint-Laurent is a parish church in the centre of the town which is believed to date from the early 11th century. It has been rebuilt several times and has both romanesque and gothic features.
 The Chapelle des Cordeliers is a 13th-century chapel constructed by the Order of St Francis, known in France as the Cordeliers for the chord they wore at their waist. A small side chapel dating from the 16th century houses a fine renaissance altarpiece.
 The sculpture "La Rivière" by Pierre Charles Lenoir is held in Parthenay Mairie.

See also
Communes of the Deux-Sèvres department

References

External links

 Web site of the communauté de communes (in French)
 The Parthenay Effect: How a Small French Town Might Save Civilization (in English)
 

Communes of Deux-Sèvres
Subprefectures in France
Poitou